Softball at the 2005 Southeast Asian Games took place in the Rosario Sports Complex in Pasig City, Philippines from November 30, 2005 to December 4, 2005.

Medal winners

External links
Southeast Asian Games Official Results

2005
2005 in softball
International softball competitions hosted by the Philippines